This is a list of German films that are scheduled to release in 2023.

January–March

April–June

July–September

October–December

References

2023
Germany